Małgorzata Glinka-Mogentale (born 30 September 1978) is a Polish retired volleyball player. She was a member of Poland women's national volleyball team in 1997–2014, a participant of the Olympic Games Beijing 2008, double European Champion (2003, 2005), and a gold medalist of Polish, French, Spanish and Turkish national championships.

Personal life
Glinka was born in Warsaw, Poland. She has an older sister, Dorota. On June 24, 2004 she married former Italian volleyball player, Roberto Mogentale in Wadowice. In July 2009 she gave birth to their daughter Michelle.

Career

Clubs
The 195cm Glinkahttps://women.volleybox.net/pl/malgorzata-glinka-mogentale-p1560/clubs won the 2010–11 CEV Champions League with Vakıfbank Istanbul and she gained an individual award for the Most Valuable Player.

National team
Glinka was awarded Best Scorer and Most Valuable Player of the World Cup 2003.

On September 28, 2003 Poland women's national volleyball team, including Glinka, beat Turkey (3–0) in the final and won the title of European Champion 2003. She was also Best Scorer and Most Valuable Player of the tournament.

Two years later, the Polish team, with Glinka in the squad, defended the title and achieved the second title of European Champion.

In October 2009 she won with herteam mates the bronze medal of the European Championship 2009 after winning a match against Germany.

She participated with the national team at the Olympic Games 2008 held in Beijing, China.

Records
 Glinka scored 41 points in a match between Poland and Germany (European Championships 2003 - semifinal).
 In the 2012-2013 Season, Vakıfbank İstanbul won all 47 games and reached three championship trophies (Turkish Cup, CEV Champions League, Turkish League). The Turkish team never lost in the 2012-13 season.

Sporting achievements

Clubs

CEV Champions League
  2004/2005 - with Asystel Novara
  2005/2006 - with RC Cannes
  2010/2011 - with Vakıfbank Istanbul
  2012/2013 - with Vakıfbank Istanbul

CEV Cup
  1999/2000 - with Minetti Vicenza
  2000/2001 - with Minetti Vicenza
  2006/2007 - with CAV Murcia 2005

FIVB Club World Championship
  Qatar 2011 - with Vakıfbank Istanbul

National championships
 1993/1994  Polish Championship U18, with Skra Warszawa
 1994/1995  Polish Championship U20, with Skra Warszawa
 1995/1996  Polish Championship U20, with Skra Warszawa
 1996/1997  Polish Cup, with MKS Andrychów
 1996/1997  Polish Championship, with MKS Andrychów
 1997/1998  Polish Championship, with MKS Andrychów
 1998/1999  Polish Cup, with Augusto Kalisz
 1998/1999  Polish Championship, with Augusto Kalisz
 2000/2001  Italian Cup, with Minetti Vicenza
 2000/2001  Italian SuperCup, with Minetti Vicenza
 2003/2004  Italian Cup, with Asystel Novara
 2003/2004  Italian Championship, with Asystel Novara
 2005/2006  French Cup, with RC Cannes
 2005/2006  French Championship, with RC Cannes
 2006/2007  Spanish SuperCup 2006, with CAV Murcia 2005
 2006/2007  Spanish Cup, with CAV Murcia 2005
 2006/2007  Spanish Championship, with CAV Murcia 2005
 2007/2008  Spanish SuperCup 2007, with CAV Murcia 2005
 2007/2008  Spanish Cup, with CAV Murcia 2005
 2007/2008  Spanish Championship, with CAV Murcia 2005
 2010/2011  Turkish Championship, with Vakıfbank Istanbul
 2011/2012  Turkish Championship, with Vakıfbank Istanbul
 2012/2013  Turkish Cup, with Vakıfbank Istanbul
 2012/2013  Turkish Championship, with Vakıfbank Istanbul
 2013/2014  Polish Cup, with Chemik Police
 2013/2014  Polish Championship, with Chemik Police
 2014/2015  Polish SuperCup 2014, with Chemik Police
 2014/2015  Polish Championship, with Chemik Police

National team
 1996  CEV U20 European Championship
 2003  CEV European Championship
 2005  CEV European Championship

Individually
 1997 FIVB U20 World Championship - Best Spiker
 2001 CEV Cup - Most Valuable Player
 2003 CEV European Championship - Best Scorer
 2003 CEV European Championship - Most Valuable Player
 2003 FIVB World Cup - Best Scorer
 2003 FIVB World Cup - Most Valuable Player
 2004 Italian Cup - Most Valuable Player
 2006 French League - Most Valuable Player
 2007 Spanish League - Most Valuable Player
 2007 CEV European Championship - Best Spiker
 2007 Spanish Super Cup - Most Valuable Player
 2008 FIVB World Olympic Qualification Tournament - Best Spiker
 2011 CEV Champions League - Most Valuable Player
 2011 Turkish League - Best Scorer
 2012 Turkish League - Best Scorer
 2012 Turkish League - Best Spiker
 2012 Turkish League - Best Server
 2013 CEV Lifetime Award
 2014 Polish SuperCup - Most Valuable Player

State awards
 2005  Knight's Cross of Polonia Restituta

References

External links
 FIVB profile
 ORLEN Liga player profile

1978 births
Living people
Volleyball players from Warsaw
Sportspeople from Masovian Voivodeship
Polish women's volleyball players
Olympic volleyball players of Poland
Volleyball players at the 2008 Summer Olympics
Knights of the Order of Polonia Restituta
Polish expatriates in Italy
Expatriate volleyball players in Italy
Polish expatriates in France
Expatriate volleyball players in France
Polish expatriate sportspeople in Turkey
Expatriate volleyball players in Turkey
Polish expatriates in Spain
Expatriate volleyball players in Spain